Major League Baseball (MLB) honored its best relief pitchers with a Delivery Man of the Month Award for one pitcher during each month of the regular season from 2005 through 2013. The awards were initially part of a sponsorship agreement between MLB and package delivery company DHL Express; DHL's sponsorship ran from 2005 to 2010. There was also a Delivery Man of the Year Award; all of the Delivery Man awards were discontinued after 2013. A new Reliever of the Month Award was first awarded in 2017.

Winners

Winners of the monthly award were decided by a four-man panel, which originally consisted of Dennis Eckersley, Jerome Holtzman, Rick Sutcliffe and Bob Watson. The panel later included Darryl Hamilton and Mike Bauman, a national columnist for MLB.com.

Trevor Hoffman received the award more than any other pitcher, with four wins between May 2005 and May 2009. Four other pitchers received the award three times: Craig Kimbrel, Joe Nathan, J. J. Putz, and Rafael Soriano. The most wins by a team was four, accomplished by the Kansas City Royals via Joakim Soria (2) and Greg Holland (2); the Pittsburgh Pirates via José Mesa, Joel Hanrahan, and Jason Grilli (2); and the San Diego Padres via Hoffman (3) and Heath Bell.

See also
Baseball awards
List of MLB awards

References

External links
List of winners at MLB.com
List of winners at Baseball Almanac

Major League Baseball trophies and awards
Awards established in 2005
Awards disestablished in 2013
DHL